Gyula Válent (27 September 1926 – 10 September 2010) is a Hungarian swimmer who won a silver medal in the 100 m backstroke at the 1947 European Aquatics Championships. He competed in the same event at the 1948 Summer Olympics, but did not reach the finals.

References

1926 births
2010 deaths
Swimmers at the 1948 Summer Olympics
Olympic swimmers of Hungary
Hungarian male swimmers
European Aquatics Championships medalists in swimming
Sportspeople from Eger